Château de la Valade is a château in Bourdeilles, Dordogne, Nouvelle-Aquitaine, France. Based on an older structure, the current building dates from the 18th century.

References

Further reading

Guy Penaud, Dictionnaire des châteaux du Périgord, p. 284, éditions Sud Ouest, 1996 

Châteaux in Dordogne